Ricardo Valter da Costa (born 1 May 1981 in Goiânia) is a Brazilian football player, who currently plays for Polet Pribislavec in Croatia.

Career
Ricardo played for Atlético Goianiense before joined Zrinjski Mostar in summer 2003. In 2005 he trained with Hajduk Split for two months, but the transfer fell through. After that, Costa had a short spell with FC Metalurh Donetsk during the first half of the 2005-06 season. In January 2006, he was transferred to NK Međimurje and signed after one and a half year with NK Široki Brijeg. After four and a half year in Bosnia last with NK Široki Brijeg, joined in January 2009 to SC Weiz, he played six months in the Austrian Regional League Central with the team, before signed for League rival WAC St. Andrä in July 2009.

References

External sources
 Ricardo da Costa at playmakerstats.com (English version of ogol.com.br)

1981 births
Living people
Brazilian footballers
Brazilian expatriate footballers
Expatriate footballers in Bosnia and Herzegovina
Atlético Clube Goianiense players
HŠK Zrinjski Mostar players
NK Međimurje players
Expatriate footballers in Croatia
NK Široki Brijeg players
Association football midfielders
Expatriate footballers in Austria
Brazilian expatriate sportspeople in Austria
Sportspeople from Goiânia
21st-century Brazilian people